Ottó Temesvári (born 9 December 1934) is a former Hungarian basketball player. He competed in the men's tournament at the 1960 Summer Olympics.

References

External links
 

1934 births
Living people
Hungarian men's basketball players
Olympic basketball players of Hungary
Basketball players at the 1960 Summer Olympics
People from Szob
Sportspeople from Pest County